Grzywacz is a Polish surname. Notable people with the surname include:

Maciek Grzywacz, Polish jazz and classical pianist
Szlama Grzywacz (1909–1944), Polish member of the French Resistance
Zbylut Grzywacz (1939–2004), Polish painter, sculptor and graphic artist

See also
Grzywacz, West Pomeranian Voivodeship, village in Poland

Polish-language surnames